A Time for Us is the debut studio album by Australian recording artist Luke Kennedy, who finished second on the second season of The Voice Australia. The album was released on 12 July 2013, through Universal Music Australia. It features eight songs Kennedy performed on The Voice, two original songs, as well as two newly recorded covers.

Singles
 "Stay for a Minute" – Released on 5 July 2013. It did not reach the Aria Charts top 100.

Track listing

Charts

Release history

References

2013 debut albums